Heyes is a surname. Notable people with the surname include:

Cecilia Heyes, academic
Cressida Heyes (born 1970), Canadian philosopher
Darren Heyes (born 1978), English footballer
David Heyes (born 1946), English politician
David Heyes (cricketer) (born 1967), English cricketer
Douglas Heyes (1919–1993), American screenwriter and film producer
Harry Heyes (1895–?), English footballer
Herbert Heyes (1889–1958), American actor
Mark Heyes, Scottish television presenter
Tasman Heyes (1896–1980), Australian civil servant
Thomas Heyes, English publisher